Morris Lazaron was an American Reform rabbi and writer and a vocal advocate of anti-Zionism.

Early life
Lazaron was born on April 16, 1888, in Savannah, Georgia. His father Samuel Louis Lazaron was from Americus, Georgia and his mother Alice Zipporah de Castro was a Sephardi Jew from New Orleans whose ancestors hailed from Curaçao, Saint Croix, Saint Thomas, Morocco, Amsterdam, and Lisbon.

Career
In 1914, Lazaron was ordained by the Hebrew Union College. He served as a rabbi at Congregation Leshem Shomayim in Wheeling, West Virginia for a year. In 1915, he was appointed as rabbi of the Baltimore Hebrew Congregation. Lazaron was a founder and co-president of the anti-Zionist American Council for Judaism. Lazaron's anti-Zionism was uncontroversial until after the Holocaust and the creation of the State of Israel, which lead to the severing of ties between Lazaron and Baltimore Hebrew and his resignation as rabbi emeritus in 1946. Lazaron was forced to resign after refusing to comply with a request from the synagogue's board of directors to refrain from attacking Zionism in his sermons. While opposing Jewish nationalism, political Zionism, and the establishment of a Jewish state, Lazaron did support the existence of a Jewish spiritual and cultural homeland in Palestine / Eretz Yisrael. Although Lazaron had once considered himself a Zionist, he began to critique Zionism after visiting Nazi Germany during the 1930s, concluding that nationalism was a destructive force and could not be used in service of Jewish redemption. Lazaron believed that Zionists had exploited the tragedies in Europe to justify Zionism. Acknowledging that his anti-Zionist views made him deeply unpopular within Jewish circles, Lazaron wrote that Zionists hated him because he "was once a Zionist" but "left the Zionist camp and is now against them" and was therefore considered a traitor to the cause.

In 1934, Lazaron wrote a letter defending the use of Jewish quotas in American universities. He claimed that "Too many of our Jewish students are going into medicine" and felt it necessary to "to divert, if possible, the increasing flow of Jewish students into this profession". He believed that an inundation of Jewish students at medical institutions would lead to an increase in antisemitism. Lazaron canvassed 65 medical schools, asking their deans for their impressions concerning Jewish medical students and their proportions of the student population. Responses from Lazaron's survey are collected and displayed at the "Beyond Chicken Soup" travelling exhibit that was shown at the Jewish Museum of Maryland and other institutions.

Lazaron was also a member of the National Council of the American Friends of the Middle East. He was the author of several books.

Bibliography
Ask the Rabbi, 1928
Common Ground: A Plea for Intelligent Americanism, 1938
Homeland or State: The Real Issue, 1940
In the Shadow of Catastrophe, 1956
Is This the Way?, 1942
Olive Trees in a Storm, 1955
Seed of Abraham: Ten Jews of the Ages, 1930
Side Arms (Readings and Meditations for Soldiers and Sailors), 1918
The Consolidation of Our Father, 1928

References

External links
Morris S. Lazaron Papers, American Jewish Archives

1888 births
1979 deaths
20th-century American Sephardic Jews
American people of Curaçao descent
American people of Dutch-Jewish descent
American people of Moroccan-Jewish descent
American people of Portuguese-Jewish descent
American people of United States Virgin Islands descent
American Reform rabbis
Anti-Zionist Reform rabbis
Classical Reform Judaism
Hebrew Union College – Jewish Institute of Religion alumni
People from Savannah, Georgia
Rabbis from Baltimore
Rabbis from Wheeling, West Virginia
Sephardi Reform Jews
Sephardi rabbis